Slađan Nikolić (born 27 October 1974) is a Serbian former professional footballer who played as a midfielder and current manager.

Career
Nikolić spent the majority of his playing career at Rad in the First League of FR Yugoslavia, but also played abroad for Austria Salzburg in the Austrian Football Bundesliga.

During his managerial career, Nikolić served as an assistant, caretaker and later manager of Rad in the Serbian SuperLiga.

External links
 
 
 

Association football midfielders
Austrian Football Bundesliga players
Expatriate footballers in Austria
First League of Serbia and Montenegro players
FC Red Bull Salzburg players
FK Jedinstvo Bijelo Polje players
FK Rad managers
FK Rad players
FK Radnički Obrenovac players
FK Vojvodina players
Kosovo Serbs
LASK players
Red Star Belgrade non-playing staff
Sportspeople from Mitrovica, Kosovo
Serbia and Montenegro expatriate footballers
Serbia and Montenegro expatriate sportspeople in Austria
Serbia and Montenegro footballers
Serbian football managers
Serbian footballers
Serbian SuperLiga managers
1974 births
Living people